The Survival Handbook: A Practical Guide to Woodcraft and Woodlore is a book written by author, television presenter and outdoorsman Ray Mears. It was first published on 1 March 1990 by The Oxford Illustrated Press and then re-printed by The Promotional Reprint Co Ltd in 1994. It is a guidebook to outdoor life, survival and camping.  The difference between the two versions being that the colour photographs were printed on glossy paper in the First Edition.  It contains sections on the basics of outdoor skill, making fire by friction, obtaining food, and working with stone, flint and bone as well as working animal hide.

See also
 Survival kit
 Survivalism

Notes

External links
 Ray Mears' official web site
 Ray Mears on MySpace

Books by Ray Mears
Survival manuals
1990 non-fiction books